Matatai is a village on the south coast of New Ireland, Papua New Guinea, on Lanisso Bay. It is located in Konoagil Rural LLG.

References

Populated places in New Ireland Province